Fuad Adepapo Adeniyi (born 15 November 1994) is a professional footballer who plays as a defender who plays for Atlanta United 2 in MLS Next Pro. Born in England, he has represented Nigeria at the youth level.

Career

Youth
Adeniyi played with various youth teams, including Harrow St. Mary's, Dorset RFC, Shaftesbury, and The Football CV Academy.

College & amateur
In 2012, Adeniyi moved to the United States to play college soccer at the University of Mobile. After playing with the Rams, where he earned First Team All-League honors in 2014, Adeniyi transferred to the University of California, Santa Barbara in 2015, where he made 15 appearances.

Following college, Adeniyi spent time with FC London in 2015, and later spent two seasons with AFC Ann Arbor. In late 2016, Adeniyi made the move to Finland, playing with four-tier side Sporting Kristina.

Later in 2019, Adeniyi appeared seven times for USL League Two club Dalton Red Wolves, scoring six goals and tallying a single assist. 2021 saw Adeniyi play with Atlanta-based amateur side Club ATLetic of the ADASL.

Professional
In 2019, Adeniyi made two regular-season appearances in the NISA with Atlanta SC. On 8 June 2022, Adeniyi signed with USL League One club .

References

1994 births
Living people
Association football defenders
AFC Ann Arbor players
Expatriate footballers in England
Expatriate soccer players in the United States
English footballers
English expatriate footballers
English expatriate sportspeople in Canada
English expatriate sportspeople in Finland
English expatriate sportspeople in the United States
FC London players
Footballers from Greater London
National Independent Soccer Association players
National Premier Soccer League players
Nigerian footballers
Nigerian expatriate footballers
Nigerian expatriate sportspeople in Canada
Nigerian expatriate sportspeople in Finland
Nigerian expatriate sportspeople in the United States
Nigeria under-20 international footballers
Nigeria youth international footballers
Tormenta FC players
UC Santa Barbara Gauchos men's soccer players
USL League One players
USL League Two players